Drinkin', Lechin' & Lyin' is the debut EP by punk blues band Boss Hog.  Although out of print since its original release in 1989, Amphetamine Reptile released a vinyl/CD reissue in 2016.

Track listing

Personnel

 Cristina Martinez
 Jon Spencer
 Charlie Ondras
 Jerry Teel
 Kurt Wolf

References

External links
 

1989 debut EPs
Amphetamine Reptile Records EPs
Boss Hog albums
albums produced by Steve Albini